Bayaaswaa (Aan'aawenh (Pintail Duck) doodem) was an Ojibwa Chief of a village on the south shore of Lake Superior, located about 40 miles west of La Pointe, Wisconsin, in the late 17th century.  According to William Whipple Warren, based on oral history regarding Bayaaswaa, he was known for his prowess and wise counsel.  Warren continues that when Bayaaswaa returned from a day's hunting, he found his villagers massacred by the Fox.  Upon tracking the Fox, he found they had two captives: an old man that was tortured to death and a boy that was just about ready to be tortured.  Warren then states:

References

Ojibwe people
People of pre-statehood Wisconsin 
Native American leaders
17th-century Native Americans
Native American people from Wisconsin